Brunel Rugby League are a student rugby league club from Uxbridge, West London, England. The club play in the SRL London/South.

The club were reformed in Winter 2007 after a ten-year hiatus. From the very beginning close links were formed with the Rugby Football League and Harlequins RL. The latter oversaw the new side as they found their feet, ensuring that the coaching was of a suitable standard and promoting the team both on campus, and through their website until a good group of players were there to build on.

After six months under the affiliation of the London Amateur Rugby League, the club completed its first three games (which included a small scale tour to Wales) and obtained their first victory when they defeated Aberystwyth University in the return match from that trip in October 2008.

The club is now thriving within the university both socially and competitively, having won the league in the 2012/13 season and then reclaiming the title in 2014/15 season. Over the past 4 years the club has also produced a handful of players who have gone on to represent England students and a number of professional teams. They are always welcoming new players to the club to both introduce students to Rugby League and build on pre-existing rugby skills.

Honours

RFL Andrew Cudbertson "Spirit of SRL" Award
Brunel University Sports Federation Club of the Year Runner-up
Brunel University Sports Federation Most Developed Club
South West Rugby League 9s Bowl Runners-up
South East 1A League Champions (2012/13, 2014/15)

Notable alumni

Abi Ekoku

See also
Brunel University
B1000 (Brunel University) Radio

References

External links
 Official Website
 Union of Brunel Students

Rugby league teams in London
Brunel University London
University and college rugby league clubs
Rugby clubs established in 2007